Chungu may refer to:

People
 Lawrence Chungu (born 1991), Zambian football player
 Steven Chungu (born 1969), Zambian boxer
 Chungu Chipako (born 1971), Zambian middle-distance runner

Other uses
 Chungu, a minor character from The Lion Guard

See also
 Chungus (disambiguation)